Lake Overholser is a reservoir within the city limits of Oklahoma City, Oklahoma. Lake Overholser is formed by Overholser Dam on the North Canadian River in Oklahoma County, Oklahoma. And 4.4 mile from Yukon. Lake Overholser is named after Ed Overholser who was the 16th Mayor of the City of Oklahoma City.

The lake was originally intended to assure an adequate supply of municipal water, since the city depended primarily on the North Canadian River as a source, supplemented by private wells. The need for flood control capability became obvious when the river flooded in 1923, it breached the Lake Overholser Dam, and inundated much of the city.

Description

Lake
The lake covers approximately 1,500 acres (6 km2) and was constructed in 1919 to provide water to a treatment plant.

U.S. Route 66
"The Mother Road" was situated along the North shore of Lake Overholser from 1926 to 1958. A 1958 Route 66 improvement project created a new alignment for the highway that relocated the roadbed about 1/4 mile North of the lake. The original 1926 section of Route 66 still exists and was renamed North Overholser Drive. This includes the picturesque Lake Overholser Bridge.  The alignment runs south of the Stonebridge Lake Estates and Ramsey Lake and is considered one of the most scenic sections of the original Route 66.

Dam

Oklahoma City residents voted a $1.5 million bond issue in 1916 to pay for the project. The dam is built of reinforced poured concrete.

The dam has four distinct sections of buttressed spillways and a solid spillway. A concrete walkway extends across the dam over the buttresses until it comes to the larger spillway, where it is carried by a Pratt through truss.

A concrete wing wall anchors the dam into the eastern river bank. The first span of the dam, between the eastern wing wall and the pump house, is wide. The brick-walled pump house has a gabled tile roof, a small chimney, and two round ventilators. It sits above four arched sluiceway openings.

1923 flood
On October 16, 1923, operators at the central telephone exchange of Oklahoma City began calling to notify subscribers living south of Grand Avenue (now Sheridan Avenue) of an impending flood caused by levee breakage at the recently built City Reservoir (now known as Lake Overholser). The daily newspaper, The Oklahoman, reported that 300 national guardsmen and American Legion volunteers had been sent to organize evacuation of a 117-block area of the city that was expected to be severely impacted by the 25-foot wall of water already heading in that direction.

Later, the paper reported that it was not the dam that had failed, but the embankment (levee) at the west end of the dam that had given way after being battered by flood waters that had built up behind the dam. The river held at that leveler two hours, but by then the levee at the east end of the dam failed, sending the downstream river level  higher in a matter of minutes.

By the time the crisis had passed, Jones, Oklahoma and Spencer, Oklahoma, two towns downstream of Oklahoma City, had been surrounded by water. The official damage estimate was five people confirmed dead and property loss was $3,500,000.

Recreational facilities
Lake Overholser is a popular fishing area for local residents. A covered fishing pier is on the southwest side of the lake. Species of fish include: white bass, bream, bluegill, striped bass, flathead catfish, crappie, carp, catfish and largemouth bass.

Boating is allowed on the lake, but swimming is prohibited. Young students have nicknamed the lake "Lake Holdhercloser" due to the lake being a popular make out spot among teens.

Notes

References

External links 
City website, source of this information
Hefner to Overholser Bike Trails
 Oklahoma Digital Maps: Digital Collections of Oklahoma and Indian Territory

Protected areas of Canadian County, Oklahoma
Geography of Oklahoma City
Overholser
Buildings and structures in Oklahoma City
Bodies of water of Canadian County, Oklahoma
Infrastructure in Oklahoma